HR 6384 is a binary star system in the southern constellation of Ara, the Altar. It is drifting closer with a radial velocity of around −34 km/s.

The system appears to be a close, interacting binary with a hot secondary component of class A or hotter. It forms a suspected ellipsoidal variable with a period of 80 days and an amplitude variation of 0.08 in magnitude. The primary component is an aging red giant/bright giant with a stellar classification of M1/M2II/III, currently on the asymptotic giant branch. With the supply of hydrogen at its core exhausted, it has expanded to 160 times the girth of the Sun. It is radiating 3,562 times the luminosity of the Sun from its enlarged photosphere at an effective temperature of 3,562 K.

References

External links
 HR 6384
 HIP 84311
 Image HD 155341

M-type bright giants
Rotating ellipsoidal variables

Ara (constellation)
Durchmusterung objects
155341
084311
6384
Arae, V829